Datuk Haji Baharum Mohamed (born 4 February 1957) was the Member of the Parliament of Malaysia for the Sekijang constituency in the state of Johor from 2004 to 2013.  He sat in Parliament as a member of the United Malays National Organisation (UMNO) in the governing Barisan Nasional coalition.

Election results

References

Living people
1957 births
People from Johor
Members of the Dewan Rakyat
United Malays National Organisation politicians
Malaysian people of Malay descent
Malaysian Muslims